Paloma Negra Desde Monterrey  is a posthumous live album by Regional Mexican singer Jenni Rivera, released on October 28, 2016 by Universal Music Latin Entertainment. It is the third and final part of a live recording trilogy of her final concert in Monterrey, Nuevo León, just three hours before her death. The album was produced by Rivera's brother, singer Juan Rivera.

Paloma Negra Desde Monterrey reached number-one on the Billboard Top Latin Albums chart in the United States. Four singles were released from the album: "Paloma Negra (Live)", "Mírame (Live)", "La Mentada Contestada (Live)", and "Sufriendo A Solas (Live)".

Background
American singer Jenni Rivera performed at the Monterrey Arena on December 8, 2012. Rivera performed for a little over three hours, accompanied by her Banda and norteño group, as well as a mariachi group. At 2:00 a.m. on December 9, when the show ended, she held a press conference at the same venue. She left the Arena along with her staff and departed from Monterrey International Airport at 3:00 a.m. CST. At approximately 3:20 a.m. CST a US-registered private Learjet 25 N345MC carrying two pilots and five passengers, including Rivera, lost contact with air traffic control near Iturbide, Nuevo León, Mexico. The plane was en route to Toluca for an appearance by Rivera on the local version of The Voice.

All on board were presumed dead by Mexican authorities when the wreckage was found later that day. Jenni Rivera's father, Pedro, confirmed in a Telemundo interview that his daughter had died in the crash. Mexican aviation authorities declared in the media that her plane was shattered into fragments which spread as far as 300 meters.

The album's release comes nearly three years after her death. It is the last part of a trilogy released by her family.

Commercial release 
In the United States, according to the Billboard Top Latin Albums chart it debuted at number one, replacing Los Dúo, Vol. 2 by Mexican singer-songwriter Juan Gabriel. The album marked Rivera's 8th number-one album on the chart, making her the female with the most number-ones, surpassing fellow Mexican American singer Selena, at seven.

Track listing

Charts

Weekly charts

Year-end charts

Release history

See also
2016 in Latin music
List of number-one Billboard Latin Albums from the 2010s

References

2016 live albums
Fonovisa Records live albums
Jenni Rivera live albums
Spanish-language live albums